Making Mr. Right is a 1987 American science fiction romantic comedy film directed by Susan Seidelman; starring John Malkovich as Jeff Peters/Ulysses and Ann Magnuson as Frankie Stone.

This film is primarily about the misadventures between an android and a woman.

Plot
Jeff Peters (John Malkovich) is an emotionally repressed scientist who cannot stand others because of their intellectual inferiority. He dreams of deep space exploration, which would be difficult because of the lack of human contact for long periods of time. He develops the Ulysses android (which looks exactly like him) for the purpose of space exploration, since an android would not be affected by the isolation.

Frankie Stone (Ann Magnuson) is hired to do public relations for the project.  She meets project manager Dr. Ramdas (Harsh Nayyar) and Jeff, who both give Frankie an overview of the Ulysses project.  As a part of her job, she must get to know the android better, in order to "humanize" him for the benefit of the project's sponsors in Congress. However, in his interaction with her, the android develops emotions and develops better social skills than the scientist himself. At one point the android impersonates Jeff in order to leave the laboratory, and stows away in Frankie's Chevrolet Corvair. After escaping he encounters human society at a shopping mall, buys a tuxedo, goes on a date with a woman named Sandy McCleary (Laurie Metcalf) who thinks he is Jeff, reducing her to an emotional wreck, and then loses his head (literally) over Frankie's best friend Trish (Glenne Headly) who has taken refuge in Frankie's apartment after walking out on her husband who is a star on the popular daytime soap opera New Jersey.

Frankie also develops feelings for the android and befriends Jeff on a lesser level. Frankie's mother Estelle Stone, (Polly Bergen) learns from Frankie's ex-boyfriend's mother that Frankie has a doctor boyfriend (Jeff) and expects Frankie to bring him to the wedding of Frankie's sister Ivy Stone. Frankie persuades Jeff to come, but Ulysses again absconds from the lab and gate-crashes the wedding.  Trish's jealous TV-star husband crashes the wedding as well and gets into a fight with Ulysses. Ulysses short-circuits and crashes into the swimming pool, turning the occasion into a public relations disaster. Frankie is fired from her job and forbidden contact with Ulysses or anyone on the project. She then uses her connections with a former client and boyfriend Steve Marcus, a candidate for Congress to attend Ulysses’ launch day in an attempt to say goodbye to Ulysses, but is reprimanded by Jeff and Dr. Ramdas for showing up. Ulysses then gives his farewell speech, in which he bemoans humanity's difficulty in forming relationships, both platonic and romantic. 

However, Ulysses appears at Frankie's front door during the launch; Jeff actually presented that final speech himself, having realized his creation has become more empathic than him. As the lack of human contact of a seven-year space mission will not be a hardship for him due to asociality, Jeff decided to go into space while the android takes his place on Earth so Ulysses and Frankie (who by now are deeply in love) can be together.

Cast
John Malkovich as Dr. Jeff Peters/Ulysses
Ann Magnuson as Frankie Stone
Glenne Headly as Trish
Ben Masters as Steve Marcus
Laurie Metcalf as Sandra "Sandy" McCleary
Polly Bergen as Estelle Stone
Harsh Nayyar as Dr. Ramdas
Hart Bochner as Don
Susan Berman as Ivy Stone
Polly Draper as Suzy Duncan
Christian Clemenson as Bruce
Merwin Goldsmith as Moe Glickstein

Reception
The film received mixed reviews from critics, as it holds a 53% rating on Rotten Tomatoes from 15 reviews.

Home media
Making Mr. Right was released to DVD by MGM Home Video on April 1, 2003.

See also
 List of American films of 1987
 The Perfect Woman
 How to Build a Better Boy

References

External links

Making Mr. Right at Turner Classic Movies 

1987 films
Android (robot) films
1980s science fiction comedy films
1987 romantic comedy films
Orion Pictures films
Films directed by Susan Seidelman
Films set in Miami
American romantic comedy films
American science fiction comedy films
1980s English-language films
1980s American films